Universiti Teknologi Brunei (UTB; Jawi: يونيبرسيتي تيكنولوݢي بروني), is a national research university based in Bandar Seri Begawan, Brunei. It was established as a higher learning institution in 1986, offering Higher National Diploma programs in engineering, business and computing. The institution was upgraded to a university in 2008 and its name was changed from Institut Teknologi Brunei to Universiti Teknologi Brunei.

History

In November 1980, the Director of Education submitted a proposal to the government calling for the establishment of Institut Teknologi Brunei. He suggested that such an institution be created to expand the provision of technical education in Brunei Darussalam. A little less than two years later, in February 1982, the proposal was accepted by the government.

As the physical establishment of the institute was expected to take some time to complete, Pusat Latihan Teknikal Brunei was developed and expanded as an embryo for the institute. Towards the later stages of its establishment in October 1985, the institute was assisted by Leeds Polytechnic in the development of its curriculum, secondment of staff, procurement of books and equipment, and recruitment of contract staff in the United Kingdom. Less than five months later, the institute took in its first intake of students.

Research
Research efforts are focused on oil and gas, green technology and water. 
 The UTB Centre for Transport Research (CfTR) was established to carry out research activities that include policy studies, transport modelling and intelligent transport system, and focuses on the areas of transport safety, highway and geotechnics, and traffic. The newly established Centre for Innovative Engineering aims to become a centre for multidisciplinary translational research.
 The UTB Centre for Road Safety Studies was established to support Road Safety Policy and strategy development through research-generated evidence, date and recommendations.

Programmes
UTB is home to around 2,303 students and 140 faculty members. It has produced 4,483 HND graduates and 128 degree graduates. Academic programmes are offered by the Faculty of Engineering, School of Computing and Informatics and School of Business: 
 Faculty of Engineering programmes are in Civil Engineering, Electrical and Electronic Engineering, Mechanical Engineering and Petroleum & Chemical Engineering. 
 School of Computing and Informatics programmes are in Creative Computing, Computer Information Systems and Computer Network Security. 
 School of Business programmes are in Economics, Accounting and Management. 
 The Centre for Communication, Teaching and Learning supports the faculty and schools in terms of students’ language proficiencies and soft skills development.

Academic programmes

Faculty of Engineering: Civil Engineering
Bachelor of Engineering (Hons) in Civil Engineering
Bachelor of Engineering (Hons) in Civil & Structural Engineering

Faculty of Engineering: Electrical & Electronic Engineering
Bachelor of Engineering (Hons) in Electrical and Electronics Engineering
Bachelor of Engineering (Hons) in Mechatronics Engineering

Faculty of Engineering: Mechanical Engineering
Bachelor of Engineering (Hons) in Mechanical Engineering

Faculty of Engineering: Petroleum and Chemical Engineering
Bachelor of Engineering (Hons) in Petroleum Engineering - Articulate Programme (2+2) with the University of New South Wales, Australia
Bachelor of Engineering (Hons) in Chemical Engineering

UTB School of Business
Bachelor Of Business (Hons) in Finance & Risk Management
Bachelor Of Business (Hons) in Accounting & Information Systems
Bachelor Of Business (Hons) in Marketing & Information Systems
Bachelor Of Business (Hons) in Applied Economics & Finance
Bachelor Of Business (Hons) in Business Information Systems
Bachelor Of Business (Hons) in Technology Management
Bachelor of Business (Hons) in Business Information Systems (Part-Time)

School of Computing & Informatics
Bachelor of Science (Hons) in Digital Media
Bachelor of Science (Hons) in Creative Multimedia
Bachelor of Science (Hons) in Internet Computing
Bachelor of Science (Hons) in Computing
Bachelor of Science (Hons) in Computing with Data Analytics
Bachelor of Science (Hons) in Computer Network & Security
Bachelor of Science (Hons) in Internet Computing (Part-Time)

School of Applied Science and Mathematics
Bachelor of Science (Hons) in Agrotechnology (minor in business)
Bachelor of Science (Hons) in Applied Mathematics and Economics
Bachelor of Science (Hons) in Food Science and Technology
Bachelor of Science (Hons) in Food Science and Human Nutrition

Centre for Communication, Teaching and Learning
The centre meets the language and soft skills needs of The Faculty of Engineering, UTB School of Business, School of Computing and Informatics, and School of Applied Science and Mathematics in UTB. Communication Skills are designed to equip students to communicate in written and oral form in a Business or Engineering environment. Students learn through interactive videos, simulation, and practice sessions on how to be better communicators.
Language Unit where Arabic, Korean, Japanese, Malay, and Mandarin Language classes are offered.
The Melayu Islam Beraja Unit is a compulsory unit for every undergraduate in the university.

Achievements
Asia's Best Business School Leadership Award at a regional award in Singapore (2010)

External links
Universiti Teknologi Brunei official website

Universities and colleges in Brunei
Brunei-Muara District
Buildings and structures in Bandar Seri Begawan
Educational institutions established in 1986
1986 establishments in Brunei